The ArthaLand Century Pacific Tower is a 32-storey office building in Bonifacio Global City in Taguig, Metro Manila, Philippines.

Design and Features
The ArthaLand Tower has 21 office floors, 14 elevators, and high-end retail outlets and other retail establishments at the ground floor and podium. It is Philippine Economic Zone Authority accredited and is aiming for LEED (Leadership in Energy and Environment Design Program) Gold and BERDE (Building for Ecologically Responsive Design Excellence) certification.

The office building was designed by Skidmore, Owings & Merrill (SOM) of New York, architect of One World Trade Center in New York City. This building is designed in collaboration with Filipino architectural firm, GF & Partners Architects Co.

The building has 28,000 sqm. of net leasable area out of a gross floor area of 34,000sqm.

Reception
The building received the Best Green Development and Highly Commended in the Best Office Architectural Design at the Philippines Property Awards 2016. At the South East Asia Property Awards 2016, the ArthaLand Tower was conferred with the Special Recognition in Sustainable Design.

References

Skyscrapers in Bonifacio Global City
Sustainable building
Sustainable architecture
Skidmore, Owings & Merrill buildings
Skyscraper office buildings in Metro Manila